Bertram may refer to:

Places
Bertram, Western Australia, a suburb of Perth, Australia
Bertram, Iowa, United States, a city
Bertram, Texas, United States, a city
Bertram Glacier, Palmer Land, Antarctica

Other uses
Bertram (name), a list of people and fictional characters with the given name or surname
 Bertram (play), an 1816 play by Irish writer Charles Maturin
Operation Bertram, an Allied deception operation leading up to the Second Battle of El Alamein
Bertram-class air-sea rescue boat, a Royal Australian Navy class of two vessels disposed of in 1988
Bertram Building, a historic building in Austin, Texas
Bertram Hall (Radcliffe College), a dormitory building
Bertram Yacht, a subsidiary of the Ferretti Group

See also
Bertrams, a UK book wholesaler
Bertrams, Gauteng, a suburb of Johannesburg, South Africa
Bartram, a surname
Bertrand (disambiguation)